
Gmina Sieroszewice is a rural gmina (administrative district) in Ostrów Wielkopolski County, Greater Poland Voivodeship, in west-central Poland.

Villages
Gmina Sieroszewice contains the villages and settlements of Bibianki, Biernacice, Bilczew, Kania, Latowice, Masanów, Namysłaki, Ołobok, Parczew, Psary, Raduchów, Rososzyca, Sieroszewice, Sławin, Strzyżew, Westrza, Wielowieś and Zamość.

Neighbouring gminas
Gmina Sieroszewice is bordered by the gminas of Brzeziny, Godziesze Wielkie, Grabów nad Prosną, Kraszewice, Mikstat, Nowe Skalmierzyce, Ostrów Wielkopolski and Przygodzice.

References
Polish official population figures 2006

Sieroszewice
Ostrów Wielkopolski County